Alabama Hollow is a shallow valley on Eglin Air Force Base near Navarre, Florida. It has an elevation of approximately 50 feet at its floor and 80 feet on either side of the hollow.

References 

Navarre, Florida
Santa Rosa County, Florida
Geography of Santa Rosa County, Florida
Valleys of the United States